Natalie Nessler (born 8 June 1976 in Bensheim, Hessen, Germany) is a former German curler.

She is a two-time European champion. She competed in two Winter Olympics: 1998 (8th place) and 2002 (5th place).

Teams

References

External links
 

Living people
1976 births
German female curlers
Curlers at the 1998 Winter Olympics
Curlers at the 2002 Winter Olympics
Olympic curlers of Germany
European curling champions
German curling champions
Sportspeople from Darmstadt (region)
People from Bergstraße (district)